New York orthohantavirus or New York virus is an Orthohantavirus.  It is considered a strain of Sin Nombre orthohantavirus.  It was first isolated from a white-footed mouse (Peromyscus leucopus) caught on an island off New York.  The virus is associated with typical hantavirus pulmonary syndrome.

See also
 Monongahela virus

References

Hantaviridae
Infraspecific virus taxa